The Alden Park Towers is an apartment building located at 8100 East Jefferson Avenue in Detroit, Michigan. It is also currently known as Alden Towers. The building was listed on the National Register of Historic Places in 1985.

Description
Alden Park Towers consists of four eight-story buildings built from red brick with stone trim. The buildings are interconnected at the first story; this level formerly housed commercial services such as grocery store and laundry. The exterior is highly ornamented, with projecting bay windows extending from the ground to the roof. The crenellated limestone at the roofline distinguishes these apartments from other similar buildings in Detroit. The buildings originally held 352 apartments; the number is currently 389.

History
The Alden Park Towers were built in 1922 as the Berman Apartments. They were built south of Jefferson to take advantage of the natural beauty of the Detroit River. They were one of the few large apartment buildings built in Detroit.

Triton Properties acquired the historic Alden Park Towers property, located on Detroit's Gold Coast (the East Jefferson riverfront) in 2012, out of foreclosure for $2 million in August 2012, and began a $5 million plus renovation of all 382 apartment units in the four towers. The project included renovation of common area, including a brand-new grand lobby with a large fireplace as the focal point, and a new fitness center with all-new equipment and flatscreen TVs. The entire building is outfitted with free Wi-Fi. The grand lobby, designed with assistance from Sharon Carlile of Royal Oak's Italmoda, mimics the lobby of a modern boutique hotel. Additionally,  major renovation to the property's riverfront was undertaken. Renovation work was completed in the first quarter 2015.

See also
 Riverfront Towers.
 International Riverfront

References

External links
 Alden Towers

National Register of Historic Places in Detroit
Residential buildings on the National Register of Historic Places in Michigan
Residential buildings completed in 1922
Tudor Revival architecture in Michigan
Apartment buildings in Detroit